Rikenellaceae is a family of bacteria. Members of this family are often found in the gastrointestinal tract of a number of different animals.

References

Bacteroidia